The 2013 Scotties Tournament of Hearts, the Canadian women's national curling championship, was held from February 16 to 24 at the K-Rock Centre in Kingston, Ontario. It was the ninth time Ontario hosted the Tournament of Hearts. Ontario last hosted the Scotties in 2010 in Sault Ste. Marie.

In the final, Rachel Homan of Ontario defeated former Scotties champion Jennifer Jones with a score of 9–6 to claim her first Scotties title. Homan and her team went on to represent Canada at the 2013 World Women's Curling Championship in Riga, Latvia.

Event summary
In the fifty-third edition of the Canadian Women's Curling Championship, there was a mix of veterans and newer faces in the team rosters. The defending champion Heather Nedohin rink represented Team Canada, while 2007 world champion Kelly Scott and her rink from British Columbia and 2008 world champion Jennifer Jones and her team from Manitoba also made appearances. Two-time world champion Mary-Anne Arsenault and her team from Nova Scotia (including six-time Hearts champion Colleen Jones throwing second stones) made a notable appearance. 2005 Canadian Junior champion Andrea Crawford skipped her team from New Brunswick, and 11-time Territories champion Kerry Galusha skipped the Northwest Territories/Yukon team. Other teams included 2010 Olympic silver medalist Kristie Moore and her rink from Alberta, 2007 Canadian Junior Champion Stacie Devereaux from Newfoundland and Labrador, 2010 Canadian Junior Champion Rachel Homan and her rink from Ontario, 2001 World Junior Champion Suzanne Birt of Prince Edward Island and 1999 Ontario & 2005 Quebec champion Allison Ross representing Quebec. Only one skip made her Hearts debut, Jill Shumay of Saskatchewan.

Team Manitoba, skipped by Jennifer Jones, became the first team to go undefeated in round robin play since Linda Moore of British Columbia did so in 1985. Jones, who made her ninth consecutive Scotties appearance, also secured her ninth consecutive spot in the playoffs. She played Team Ontario, skipped by Rachel Homan, in the page 1 vs. 2 playoff game, but lost her first game in the tournament as Homan and her team defeated her with a score of 8–5. Team British Columbia, skipped by Kelly Scott, played Team Canada, skipped by Heather Nedohin, in the page 3 vs. 4 playoff game, but lost as Team Canada's strong play gave them an 8–4 win in 9 ends. Team Canada attempted to reach their second straight final, playing in the semifinal against Manitoba. Jones made up for her poor play in the page playoffs, securing an 8–5 win for a spot in the final. Team Canada was relegated to the bronze medal game, where Team Canada and Team British Columbia battled back and forth before a missed double takeout in the final end by Nedohin gave British Columbia the win, by a score of 10–8. Manitoba and Ontario faced off for the championship in the final. Manitoba found themselves in a three-point hole when Jones missed a crucial draw, but regained some momentum with a stolen point in the fourth end and a deuce in the sixth end to tie up the game. In the seventh end, a successful double takeout by Homan led to another three-point end for Ontario, and a missed triple takeout by Jones led to a steal of two points for Ontario. The game ended after Ontario ran Manitoba out of stones in the tenth end, giving Ontario its first Scotties title in sixteen years. The Homan rink also became the first ever Ottawa-based team to win either the Scotties or the Brier.

Teams
The teams are listed as follows:

Round robin standings
Final Round Robin Standings

Round robin results
All draw times listed in Eastern Time Zone (UTC-5).

Draw 1
Saturday, February 16, 2:00 pm

Draw 2
Saturday, February 16, 7:00 pm

Draw 3
Sunday, February 17, 9:00 am

Draw 4
Sunday, February 17, 2:00 pm

Draw 5
Sunday, February 17, 7:00 pm

Draw 6
Monday, February 18, 2:00 pm

Draw 7
Monday, February 18, 7:30 pm

Draw 8
Tuesday, February 19, 2:00 pm

Draw 9
Tuesday, February 19, 7:00 pm

*Sonnenberg spared for Moore in skipping Alberta for this game.

Draw 10
Wednesday, February 20, 2:00 pm

Draw 11
Wednesday, February 20, 7:00 pm

Draw 12
Thursday, February 21, 9:00 am

Draw 13
Thursday, February 21, 2:00 pm

Draw 14
Thursday, February 21, 7:30 pm

Draw 15
Friday, February 22, 9:00 am

Draw 16
Friday, February 22, 2:00 pm

Draw 17
Friday, February 22, 7:30 pm

Playoffs

3 vs. 4
Saturday, February 23, 2:00 pm

1 vs. 2
Saturday, February 23, 7:00 pm

Semifinal
Sunday, February 24, 9:00 am

Bronze medal game
Sunday, February 24, 2:00 pm

Final
Sunday, February 24, 7:00 pm

Statistics

Top 5 player percentages
Round robin only

Awards
The awards and all-star teams are as follows:

All-Star Teams
First Team
 Skip:  Jennifer Jones, Manitoba
 Third:  Kaitlyn Lawes, Manitoba
 Second:  Alison Kreviazuk, Ontario
 Lead:  Dawn Askin, Manitoba

Second Team
 Skip:  Rachel Homan, Ontario
 Third:  Jeanna Schraeder, British Columbia
 Second:  Jill Officer, Manitoba
 Lead:  Laine Peters, Canada

Marj Mitchell Sportsmanship Award
  Sasha Carter, British Columbia

Joan Mead Builder Award
 Andrew Klaver, Scotties Tournament of Hearts photographer

Sandra Schmirler Most Valuable Player Award
  Lisa Weagle, Ontario lead

Shot of the Week Award
  Rachel Homan, Ontario skip

References

External links

 
Sport in Kingston, Ontario
Curling in Ontario
Ontario
Scotties Tournament of Hearts
Scotties Tournament of Hearts
Scotties Tournament of Hearts